Morne à Craie is a mountain on the island of Terre-de-Haut in the archipelago of the Îles des Saintes in Guadeloupe.
The south side of the mountain is a classified natural area of ecological interest for its flora and fauna, and was acquired in 2003 by the Conservatoire du Littoral.

References

Geography of Îles des Saintes
Mountains of Guadeloupe